Takht-e Kabud Nargesi (also Romanized as Takht-e Kabūd Nargesī; also known as Nargesī-ye Takht-e Kabūd, Takht-e Kabūd, Takht-e Kabūd Āsmārī, and Takht Kabūd) is a village in Rud Zard Rural District, in the Central District of Bagh-e Malek County, Khuzestan Province, Iran. At the 2006 census, its population was 1,231, in 219 families.

References 

Populated places in Bagh-e Malek County